Professional Disc (PFD) is a digital recording optical disc format introduced by Sony in 2003 primarily for XDCAM, its tapeless camcorder system. It was one of the first optical formats to utilize a blue laser, which allowed for a higher density of data to be stored on optical media compared to infrared laser technology used in the CD and red laser technology used in the DVD format.

Technology

PFD uses a 405 nm wavelength and a numerical aperture (NA) of 0.85 for the laser, allowing 23 GB of data to be stored on one 12 cm disc – the equivalent to nearly five single-layer DVDs, and a 1x speed data transfer rate of 88 Mbit/s for reading and 72 Mbit/s for writing.  After the 23GB disc was released, a dual-layer 50 GB was developed and released.

This format is sometimes confused with the Blu-ray Disc format, another optical disc format using blue-violet lasers and supported by Sony. Even the PFD's caddy and Blu-ray's prototype caddy (later dropped) looked very similar. Capabilities differ; single-layer PFD discs have a capacity of 23 GB whereas Blu-ray discs can store 25 GB. However, Blu-ray discs currently allow a 2x data transfer rate of 72 Mbit/s – lower than PFD. This is because PFD discs use much higher quality media and drives use higher quality components, making them prohibitively expensive for the consumer segment to which Blu-ray is aimed. PFD discs can have a capacity of up to 100 GB for rewritable discs, and 128 GB for write-once discs.

Disc Sizes

Applications/products

XDCAM video system 
The PFD format is used as the recording medium in Sony's XDCAM professional video devices, both for standard definition and high definition applications.

Professional Disc for Data (PDD) 
Professional Disc for DATA (PDD or ProDATA) was a general-use recording media variant of PFD, aimed primarily at small and medium-sized enterprise for data archival and backup. PDD drives and media became available in mid-2004. The BW-RS101 external SCSI-3 drive originally retailed in the UK at £2,344 (excl. VAT) directly from Sony, and 23 GB write-once and re-writeable media retailed for £30 each. Two other drives – the BW-F101/A internal SCSI drive and the BW-RU101 external USB 2.0 drive also became available around the same time.

On March 31, 2007, Professional Disc for DATA reached their "end of life". PFD are still being manufactured and used in Sony XDCAM devices. Sony states that PDD and PFD media are not compatible, but does not specify the exact differences between products.

Sony's PDW-U1 Professional Disc drive is an external drive that connects via USB 2.0 to Windows or Mac OS X computers using the included free software from Sony.  In a firmware and software upgrade in late July 2009, Sony added the ability for computer users to store any computer files on the Professional Disc into the dedicated "User Data" folder.

See also
 Blu-ray Disc
 HD DVD
 Ultra Density Optical
 Optical disc

References

External links
Sony Global - Professional Disc for DATA
Sony Storage Solutions - ProData
Sony b2b - Professional Disk

Audiovisual introductions in 2003
Optical computer storage media